Penshaw railway station served the village of Penshaw, Tyne and Wear, England from 1840 to 1964 on the Leamside line.

History 
The first Penshaw station was opened on 9 March 1840 by the Durham Junction Railway on the north side of the railway bridge over Station Road. Further extensions to this route ultimately led to creation of the Leamside line.

On 20 February 1852, the N&DJR opened a branch from the Leamside line, slightly to the north of Penshaw station, to a junction with the Durham & Sunderland Railway at Sunderland although passenger services between Penshaw and Sunderland Fawcett Street did not commence until 1 June 1853.

The original station was replaced by a new one situated south of the bridge over Station Road on 1 July 1881 by the North Eastern Railway. To the east of the station, there were goods sidings and a goods warehouse. To the south of the warehouse was a cattle dock reached by a dead-end siding. As traffic declined the station was demoted to an unstaffed halt on 14 August 1961 and it was shown as an unstaffed stating on the timetable from 18 June 1962, although it was not referred to as a halt. The Beeching Report dealt with a lot of stations in County Durham which included the closure of the Washington Line, which happened on 9 September 1963, though by this time the few remaining services on the Pelaw to  route did not actually stop at Pelaw. There were little to no objections to the line closing.

References

External links 

Disused railway stations in Tyne and Wear
Former North Eastern Railway (UK) stations
Railway stations in Great Britain opened in 1881
Railway stations in Great Britain closed in 1964
1881 establishments in England
1964 disestablishments in England
Beeching closures in England